The Capt. Alexander Crocker House is a historic house located in the Hyannis village of Barnstable, Massachusetts.

Description and history 
The -story wood-frame house was built c. 1865, and his one of the village's finest Italianate houses. It has roughly square proportions, with an off-center entry flanked by a single-story projecting bay window, both of which are topped by cornices with brackets. Above them are three sash windows with projecting lintels, and there is a round-arch window in the gable. The roof line is studded with paired brackets. There is a period barn on the property which is topped by a cupola. Its first owner was a ship's captain.

The house was listed on the National Register of Historic Places on March 13, 1987.

See also
National Register of Historic Places listings in Barnstable County, Massachusetts

References

Houses in Barnstable, Massachusetts
National Register of Historic Places in Barnstable, Massachusetts
Houses on the National Register of Historic Places in Barnstable County, Massachusetts
Houses completed in 1865
Italianate architecture in Massachusetts